This page lists the criteria used to determine the field for the 2020 PGA Championship, the first of the men's major golf championships in 2020, and the players who qualified via them. Some criteria were amended after the tournament was postponed due to the COVID-19 pandemic.

Entrants by eligibility criteria
Each player is listed according to the first category by which he qualified with additional categories in which he qualified shown in parentheses.

1. Former winners of the PGA Championship
All former winners of the PGA Championship:

Rich Beem
Keegan Bradley
Jason Day (9)
Jason Dufner
Martin Kaymer
Brooks Koepka (3,7,9,10,11)
Davis Love III
Rory McIlroy (5,7,9,10,11)
Shaun Micheel
Phil Mickelson (10)
Justin Thomas (9,10,11)
Jimmy Walker
Tiger Woods (2,9,10,11)

The following former champions did not enter: Paul Azinger, Mark Brooks, Jack Burke Jr., Steve Elkington, Dow Finsterwald, Raymond Floyd, Al Geiberger, Wayne Grady, David Graham, Don January, John Mahaffey, Larry Nelson, Bobby Nichols, Jack Nicklaus, Gary Player, Nick Price, Jeff Sluman, Dave Stockton, Hal Sutton, David Toms, Lee Trevino, Bob Tway, Lanny Wadkins, Yang Yong-eun
Pádraig Harrington withdrew due concerns surrounding COVID-19.
John Daly withdrew due to health concerns.
Vijay Singh withdrew due to injury.

2. Recent winners of the Masters Tournament
Winners of the last five Masters Tournaments:

Sergio García (10)
Patrick Reed (9,10,11)
Danny Willett

3. Recent winners of the U.S. Open
Winners of the last five U.S. Open Championships:

Dustin Johnson (7,9,10,11)
Jordan Spieth (4,7,9,10)
Gary Woodland (7,9,11)

4. Recent winners of The Open Championship
Winners of the last five Open Championships:

Zach Johnson
Shane Lowry (7,9,11)
Henrik Stenson (10)

Francesco Molinari (10) did not play.

5. Recent winners of The Players Championship
Winners of the last three Players Championships:

Kim Si-woo
Webb Simpson (9,10,11)

6. Winner of the Senior PGA Championship in 2019
Winner of the 2019 Senior PGA Championship:

Ken Tanigawa

7. Leading finishers in the previous PGA Championship
Top 15 and ties in the 2019 PGA Championship:

Patrick Cantlay (9,11)
Jazz Janewattananond
Kang Sung-hoon (9)
Matt Kuchar (9)
Luke List
Chez Reavie (9,11)
Adam Scott (9,11)
Erik van Rooyen
Matt Wallace

8. Leading PGA professionals
Top 20 in the 2019 PGA Professional Player of the Year Standings:

Michael Auterson
Danny Balin
Alex Beach
Rich Berberian Jr.
Justin Bertsch
Jason Caron
Ben Cook
Judd Gibb
Jeff Hart
Marty Jertson
Zach J. Johnson
Alex Knoll
Rob Labritz
David Muttitt
John O'Leary
Rod Perry
Jeff Roth
Bob Sowards
Ryan Vermeer
Shawn Warren

9. Leading money winners on the PGA Tour
Top 70 in the PGA Championship Points standings (based on official PGA Tour money earned, calculated from the 2019 AT&T Byron Nelson to the 2020 3M Open):

An Byeong-hun
Abraham Ancer
Daniel Berger (11)
Cameron Champ (11)
Corey Conners
Joel Dahmen
Bryson DeChambeau (10,11)
Tyler Duncan (11)
Harris English
Tony Finau (10)
Matt Fitzpatrick
Tommy Fleetwood
Dylan Frittelli (11)
Lanto Griffin (11)
Adam Hadwin
Brian Harman
Tyrrell Hatton (10,11)
Tom Hoge
Billy Horschel
Viktor Hovland (11)
Mackenzie Hughes
Im Sung-jae (11)
Kevin Kisner
Andrew Landry (11)
Nate Lashley (11)
Danny Lee
Marc Leishman (11)
Adam Long
Hideki Matsuyama
Collin Morikawa (11)
Sebastián Muñoz (11)
Kevin Na (11)
Joaquín Niemann (11)
Louis Oosthuizen
Carlos Ortiz
Ryan Palmer
Scott Piercy
J. T. Poston (11)
Jon Rahm (10,11)
Justin Rose (10)
Rory Sabbatini
Xander Schauffele
Scottie Scheffler
Cameron Smith (11)
Brandt Snedeker
Brendan Steele
Sepp Straka
Kevin Streelman
Nick Taylor (11)
Michael Thompson (11)
Brendon Todd (11)
Matthew Wolff (11)

Charles Howell III withdrew due to injury.
Vaughn Taylor withdrew due to injury.

10. Playing members of the Ryder Cup teams in 2018
Playing members of the United States and European 2018 Ryder Cup teams ranked within the top 100 of the Official World Golf Ranking as of July 27, 2020:

Paul Casey
Rickie Fowler
Ian Poulter
Bubba Watson

Alex Norén (115) and Thorbjørn Olesen (207) were ranked outside the top 100; Norén was later added to the field as the 12th and final alternate.

11. Tournaments winners on the PGA Tour
Winners of tournaments co-sponsored or approved by the PGA Tour since the 2019 PGA Championship:

Jim Herman
Richy Werenski

12. PGA of America invitees not included in the categories above
PGA of America invitees not included in the categories above:

Christiaan Bezuidenhout
Rafa Cabrera-Bello
Jorge Campillo
Jim Furyk
Lucas Glover
Benjamin Hébert
Lucas Herbert
Max Homa
Ryo Ishikawa
Matt Jones
Chan Kim
Tom Kim
Marcus Kinhult
Kurt Kitayama
Jason Kokrak
Tom Lewis
Li Haotong
Mike Lorenzo-Vera
Joost Luiten
Robert MacIntyre
Graeme McDowell
Keith Mitchell
Shaun Norris
Pan Cheng-tsung
Victor Perez
Andrew Putnam
Matthias Schwab
Charl Schwartzel
Steve Stricker
Bernd Wiesberger

Shugo Imahira, ranked inside the top-100 in the Official World Golf Ranking, would have been an expected invitee but did not play.
Eddie Pepperell, Thomas Pieters and Lee Westwood appeared on a list of players expected to compete, released by the PGA of America on July 21, but announced that they would not play.
Paul Waring withdrew due to a back injury.
J. B. Holmes withdrew due to a shoulder injury.
Branden Grace withdrew after testing positive for COVID-19 at the Barracuda Championship.

13. Leading money winners on the PGA Tour (additional)
Players outside the top 70 in PGA Championship Points (per category 9) to complete the field:

Mark Hubbard
Doc Redman
Cameron Tringale

Alternates
Alternates (per category 13):
Harold Varner III (80th in standings) – replaced Thomas Pieters
Troy Merritt (82) – replaced Pádraig Harrington
Talor Gooch (85) – replaced Francesco Molinari
Russell Henley (87) – replaced Paul Waring
Wyndham Clark (89) – replaced J. B. Holmes
Brian Stuard (91) – replaced Charles Howell III
Bud Cauley (92) – replaced Branden Grace
Ryan Moore (93) – took spot reserved for winner of the WGC-FedEx St. Jude Invitational, but did not play due to scheduling issues
Denny McCarthy (95) – replaced John Daly
Emiliano Grillo (96) – replaced Vijay Singh
Zhang Xinjun (97) – replaced Ryan Moore
Alex Norén (99) – replaced Vaughn Taylor

Nationalities in the field

Past champions in the field

Made the cut

Missed the cut

Notes

References 

PGA Championship